Mauligobius is a genus of ray-finned fish from the family Gobiidae native to the eastern Atlantic Ocean. The name of this genus honours the ichthyologist and taxidermist Günther Edmund Maul (1909-1997) of the Museu Municipal do Funchal on Madeira for his assistance in making material and information available which the author, Peter Miller, used in his research on Macaronesian gobies.

Species
There are currently two recognized species in this genus:
 Mauligobius maderensis (Valenciennes, 1837)
 Mauligobius nigri (Günther, 1861)

References

Gobiidae